The Boston Museum was a proposed history museum for the city of Boston, Massachusetts. 
The museum had chosen a nickname, "BoMu", before it was terminated.

Theme
The museum proposed to bring the region's 400-year history into focus, inspiring local residents and visitors from across the globe to explore Boston's rich heritage, historic sites and cultural attractions. A  museum and marketplace concept was in development, with additional plans for a low-lying pedestrian bridge to serve as a gateway to the museum and a critical connector of park parcels along the Rose Kennedy Greenway.  The proposal included five core exhibition galleries, a gallery for national touring exhibitions, an all-purpose theater space, educational spaces, a City Room, a ground-floor marketplace, and a green roof.

Educational mission

The Boston Museum planned to broaden and deepen the appreciation of Boston as a "living classroom" and campus for thematic learning through partnerships with other historic sites and cultural institutions, sharing best practices and working in concert to create new programming and enrichment activities for educators and students throughout the region. It also hoped to  reach out to national audiences through extensive use of electronic links and new media technology.

The Boston Museum planned to be a transformative educational experience for learners of all ages and styles. Its galleries would have used a wide variety of approaches aimed at engaging families, school children and adults at all stages of life. Most importantly, the stories visitors encountered would have had personal resonance, whether of ancestors arriving on Long Wharf or their own physical relationship to the place of Boston.

Location
If designated by the Massachusetts Turnpike Authority, the museum would have been built on Parcel 9 in Downtown Boston, adjacent to the Rose Kennedy Greenway, Faneuil Hall, the Quincy Market, and abutting from the downtown Haymarket.  The Boston Museum would have built a pedestrian bridge on Parcel 12, which would have directly connected the Greenway to the museum.  In October 2005 the Massachusetts Turnpike Authority designated the project as the official developer for Parcel 12.

Structure
The planned building was to have been designed by Cambridge Seven Associates. Since beginning in approximately March 2010, Rose Kennedy Greenway planners believed the Greenway was better suited for natural attractions than for large buildings, Boston Museum planners, including CEO Frank Keefe began looking for another location off the Greenway.

The original planned building was designed by Moshe Safdie and Associates and was estimated to cost $124 million. The proposal included exhibition galleries, theater spaces, a series of education and meeting rooms, a grand hall for large public meetings and a grand concourse.  The building would also have featured restaurants and an information center, as well as green space. The Safdie Proposal was superseded by a new plan calling for a different design due to Parcel 12 site conditions. The need to build over two highway ramps would have added such additional cost that the Boston Museum Project sought permission to construct a smaller alternate project on Parcel 9 "The Haymarket". Parcel 12 would then have been used as the site of a sculptural bridge leading pedestrian traffic across to be able to enter the museum or walk on toward North Station.

Core galleries
 Place Over Time would have told the story of the ecological and economic transformation of Massachusetts.
 Conscience and Confrontation would have explored the periodic eruption of political contention ruling Massachusetts, which has often set an agenda for political change across the nation and the globe.
 People of the Bay would have explored the succession of cultures, from native peoples through the latest wave of immigrants, as they created personal, family, community, and inter-group experiences in this region.
 Innovation Odyssey would have focused on the region's many breakthroughs and “firsts” that have had a global reach, spreading liberty and the abolition of slavery, advancing the causes of universal education and expanded health care, igniting both the Industrial Revolution and the Information Age.
 Sports Town was envisioned as an entry point for visitors who might not see themselves as typical museum-goers.  They would have been drawn into the gallery - and the museum beyond - because exhibit content would have related to their lifelong passion of sports, which had many "firsts" is Massachusetts.

Termination
In November 2012, the Massachusetts Department of Transportation rejected the Boston Museum's bid to be designated as the developer of Parcel 9, adjacent to the Rose Kennedy Greenway, a site created by the Big Dig highway construction project.

In January 2013, the Board of the Boston Museum voted to terminate its efforts to build a museum and to disband the organization.

People involved

Board of directors
 Louis Miller - Boston Museum Board Chairman; Rackemann, Sawyer & Brewster
 Roger Berkowitz - President and CEO, Legal Sea Foods
 Janey Bishoff - Bishoff Communications
 Janice Bourque
 William M. Bulger - President Emeritus, University of Massachusetts
 Jill Ker Conway - President Emerita, Smith College
 Ralph Cooper - Veterans Benefits Clearinghouse
 Callie Crossley - WGBH Commentator
 Anne D. Emerson - President Emerita, Boston Museum
 David Feigenbaum - Senior Principal, Fish & Richardson
 John Fish - CEO, Suffolk Construction
 Ronald Lee Fleming - Founder, Townscape Institute
 Richard M. Freeland - Massachusetts Commissioner of Higher Education
 William Galatis - Dunkin' Brands Franchisee
 Perrin M. Grayson, Esq.
 Frank Keefe - CEO, Boston Museum
 Don Law - President, Live Nation - New England
 Alyce J. Lee
 Tunney Lee - Professor Emeritus, Senior Lecturer, MIT
 Kevin McCall - CEO, Paradigm Properties
 Jane Manopoli Patterson
 James E. Rooney - Massachusetts Convention Center Authority
 William B. Tyler - Chairman Emeritus - Board; Rackemann, Sawyer & Brewster
 James B. White - President Emeritus -Board; Elaw Corporation
 Linda Whitlock - Former Nicholas President & CEO, Boys and Girls Clubs of Boston
 J. David Wimberly - Chairman Emeritus, Frontier Capital Management

National Advisory Committee
 Lou Casagrande - Dean of Education, Social Work, Child Life and Family Studies, Wheelock College
 Spencer R. Crew - Executive Director and CEO, National Underground Railroad Freedom Center
 Drew Gilpin Faust - President, Harvard University
 Henry Louis Gates - Director, W.E.B. DuBois Institute, Harvard University
 David Gergen - Director, Center for Public Leadership, Harvard University
 Doris Kearns Goodwin - Historian/ Author
 Marian L. Heard - President and Chief Executive Officer, Oxen Hill Partners
 Michael Patrick MacDonald - Author/ Activist
 Thomas H. O'Connor - Professor Emeritus/ University Historian, Boston College
 Nathaniel Philbrick - Author
 Robert D. Putnam - Peter and Isabel Malkin Professor of Public Policy, Harvard University
 Elizabeth Shannon - Writer/ Teacher/ Administrator, Boston University
 Cathy Douglas Stone, Esq.
 Margot Stern Strom - Executive Director, Facing History and Ourselves
 Andrew Viterbi - President, The Viterbi Group

Project consultants
 Richard Rabinowitz, Chief Historian
 Cambridge Seven Associates, Architecture
 Mikyoung Kim, Landscsape Architecture
 Boston History and Innovation Collaborative, Content for Innovation Gallery and other galleries
 ConsultEcon, Inc., Economic Feasibility Consultants

References

External links
 The Boston Museum website—archived November 13, 2012
 Cambridge Seven Associates
 Boston Museum seeks new site,  The Boston Globe

City museums in the United States
Defunct museums in Boston
History museums in Massachusetts
Failed museum proposals in the United States